John Vincent Mansfield (born 13 September 1946) is an English former footballer who played in the Football League as a midfielder for Colchester United.

Career

Born in Colchester, Mansfield signed for hometown club Colchester United as an apprentice, breaking into the first team in 1964 the day before his 18th birthday on 12 September in a 3–0 defeat to Brentford at Layer Road. He scored his first goal for the club on 10 May 1966 in a 1–0 victory at Southport.

Mansfield was involved in 34 Football League games between his debut in 1964 and his final game in 1968, a 1–0 home defeat to Workington in the League Cup on 4 September. He had scored three goals for the club with his final goal scored on 3 December 1966 in a 4–0 away win against Darlington.

After leaving Colchester following his final appearance, he went on to join non-league outfits Brentwood Town and Chelmsford City.

References

1946 births
Living people
Sportspeople from Colchester
English footballers
Association football midfielders
Colchester United F.C. players
Brentwood Town F.C. players
Chelmsford City F.C. players
English Football League players